Claudio Damiani is an Italian poet. He was born in San Giovanni Rotondo in the south of Italy (Puglia) in 1957 though at an early age he moved to Rome, where he still lives. He made his debut in 1978 in Nuovi Argomenti, the magazine directed by Pasolini, Moravia and Bertolucci. In the first half of the 1980s he was among the founders of the magazine Braci, where a new classicism was proposed.  Inspired by ancient Latin poets and by the Italian Renaissance, his themes are mainly nature and cosmos, with a side attention to current scientific research.
"If the Horatian scenes of Sabina refer to a type of modern Arcadia, their specific quality is above all to approach a voice that is internal and literally poetic, refounded and reguarded like an unexpected and precious gift" (Roberto Galaverni, Contemporary Italian Poets, Modern Poetry in translation no. 15, 1999).
His poems have been interpreted by such actors as Nanni Moretti and Piera Degli Esposti. Main prizes and awards: Premio Montale, Premio Luzi, Premio Lerici, Premio Volterra, Premio Laurentum, Premio Brancati, Premio Frascati, Premio Alpi Apuane, Premio Camaiore.

Poetry 
Fraturno (Abete, 1987)
La mia casa (Pegaso, 1994)
La miniera (Fazi, 1997)
Eroi (Fazi, 2000)
Attorno al fuoco (Avagliano, 2006)
Sognando Li Po (Marietti, 2008)
Poesie (anthology 1984-2010 edited by Marco Lodoli, Fazi, 2010)
Il fico sulla fortezza (Fazi, 2012)
Ode al monte Soratte (Fuorilinea, 2015)
Cieli celesti (Fazi, 2016)
La vita comune. Poesie e commenti (with Arnaldo Colasanti) (Melville, 2018)
Endimione (Interno Poesia, 2019)

Theatrical texts 
Il Rapimento di Proserpina, in Prato Pagano, nn. 4-5, Il Melograno, 1987
Ninfale, Lepisma, 2013

Essays 
Orazio, Arte poetica, con interventi di autori contemporanei (Fazi, 1995)
Le più belle poesie di Trilussa (Mondadori, 2000)
La difficile facilità. Appunti per un laboratorio di poesia (Lantana Editore, 2016)
L'era nuova. Pascoli e i poeti di oggi, with Andrea Gareffi, (Liber Aria Edizioni, 2017)

Bibliography in English 
Franco Buffoni, Italian Contemporary Poets, Fuis, 2016
New Italian Poetry, An Anthology, Edited by A. Moscè, Gradiva Publications, Stony Brook, New York, 2006, Tr. Emanuel di Pasquale, pp. 204–209
Journal of Italian Translation, Vol. I, No. 2, 2006, Editor L. Bonaffini, Tr. Luigi Fontanella, pp. 168–169
Modern Poetry in Translation No. 15, Contemporary Italian Poets, King’s College London, 1999, Tr. John Satriano, pp. 31–34

References

External links 
Italian Wikipedia
Official website (in italian, with a page in English and in other languages)
Enciclopedia Treccani
Italian Poetry

1957 births
Living people
20th-century Italian poets
Italian male poets
People from San Giovanni Rotondo
20th-century Italian male writers